Alté (locally pronounced as "uhl-teh") is a fusion genre of music that combines elements of afrobeats, dancehall, reggae, hip hop, and alternative R&B. The term was coined in the 2010s by Nigerian music group DRB LasGidi, meaning alternative and "individualistic and non-traditional modes of self-expression" through music and fashion.

Characteristics
Alté fuses a wide array of musical influences from afrobeats, rap, R&B, soul, dancehall, and others. The term was coined by DRB LasGidi members and was first heard on Boj's 2014 song "Paper"; it was later used to describe left-field styles of music. TeeZee explained about the term saying "Alté is Nigerian lingo for 'alternative' which means freedom of expression essentially through any medium. It's been going on since the '60s as Africans always experimented with music. It became recognized as a style or genre from about 2012 upwards and it broke into the mainstream in 2016 with the rise of its new stars." Its fashion culture has been inspired by the early 2000s, and its music videos have been inspired by 1990s Nollywood horror drama.

History
The alté movement started around 2007 as exposure to the internet became prevalent among young Nigerians. The mid-2010s saw the emergence of the musical genre from DRB LasGidi members TeeZee, Boj, and Fresh L. The style gained commercial success in the late 2010s with other alté artists and pioneers including: Cruel Santino, Odunsi (The Engine), Zamir, Tems, Lady Donli, Nonso Amadi, Tay Iwar, Ayra Starr, Amaarae, WANI, Wavy the Creator, and Tomi Agape. In 2017, Show Dem Camp released the song "Popping Again" featuring Boj and Odunsi (The Engine), with the music video showcasing the alté generation's stylistic culture.

Success 
Commercially, the genre has gained success, with a few of its artists making it into the American and British charts. In October 2021, Tems' EP If Orange Was a Place became the first alté extended play to earn a spot on the Billboard World Albums and US Heatseekers Albums charts.

Impact
On 24 June 2022, the initial release of the Nigerian film Glamour Girls, a sequel to 1994's Glamour Girls, features (97%) alté songs on its soundtrack.

References 

21st-century music genres
Nigerian styles of music
Music of the African diaspora
Indie music
Fusion music genres